The Dr. R. N. Cooper Municipal General Hospital is a renowned public hospital located in Juhu, Mumbai, India. It is owned and operated by the Brihanmumbai Municipal Corporation. This hospital was upgraded into medical college in 2015.This is one of the five government medical college in the city of Mumbai, out of which four ( GSMC, LTMMC, TNMC & HBTMC) come under jurisdiction of MCGM (MUNICIPAL CORPORATION OF GREATER MUMBAI) and GMC MUMBAI comes under Government of Maharashtra. Being one of the only five government medical colleges in the city of Mumbai, HBTMC requires UG and PG students to have a very high score in NEET UG & NEET PG(NExT) usually 98.5~99.5 percentile in an exam which is appeared by an average of 1.6 million/16 lakh students for NEET UG and 0.1 million/1lakh students for NEET PG(NExT) 

It was started in 1969 as a maternity home before it was converted into a full-fledged general hospital in 1970.

The hospital underwent massive reconstruction after the original building was declared unfit for use in 1999. The new upgrade, at a cost of 321 crore, includes more beds, as well as systems for rainwater harvesting and sewage treatment. The new hospital design includes an infection control design to prevent doctors from contracting tuberculosis while on duty.

Departments
The hospital/college has the following departments:
Anaesthesiology
Anatomy  
Biochemistry 
Community Medicine
Dentistry & Maxillofacial surgery
Dermatology & Venereology
Forensic Medicine
General Surgery
Internal Medicine
Microbiology
Neurosurgery
Obstetrics and gynaecology
Ophthalmology
Orthopaedics
Otorhinolaryngology
Paediatrics
Pathology  
Pharmacology         
Physiology
Physiotherapy & Occupational Therapy
Psychiatry
Pulmonary Medicine
Radiology

Incidents
There were protests at the hospital after a patient attacked a nurse in April 2020.

Sushant Singh Rajput Death 
Sushant Singh Rajput was found dead in his Mumbai apartment on 14 June 2020. Post mortem of Sushant Singh Rajput was conducted on Cooper hospital late night. While his death was initially ruled a suicide by the Mumbai Police, it now being investigated by the Central Bureau of Investigation (CBI).

References 

Hospitals in Mumbai
Hospitals established in 1969
Universities and colleges in Mumbai
Medical colleges in Maharashtra
Affiliates of Maharashtra University of Health Sciences
1969 establishments in Maharashtra
Municipal hospitals in India